Troy Stone (born 13 December 1971) is an Australian rugby league footballer who played as a professional in England and Australia.

Background
Stone was born in Paddington, New South Wales, Australia.

Playing career 
A junior from Goulbourn United, Stone debuted in 1993 for the Cronulla Sharks as a centre.

However, in 1994, when Stone moved to join the Dragons he moved into the front row. 
Stone played in the 1996 Grand Final for St George, which they lost to Manly. Also in 1996, Stone played in his only representative game, playing for NSW City in their annual clash with NSW Country.

Stone then played the 1997 Super League season with the new Hunter Mariners franchise before joining the Canterbury Bulldogs. Stone played from the interchange bench for the Canterbury Bulldogs in their loss at the 1998 NRL grand final to the Brisbane Broncos.

Halfway through the 2001 NRL season, Stone joined the Huddersfield Giants after receiving little game time at Canterbury.

Stone spent a season with the Widnes Vikings before retiring at the end of 2002.

References

1971 births
Living people
Australian rugby league players
Canterbury-Bankstown Bulldogs players
Cronulla-Sutherland Sharks players
Huddersfield Giants players
Hunter Mariners players
New South Wales City Origin rugby league team players
Rugby league props
St. George Dragons players
Widnes Vikings players